Judy Battista (born March 10, 1966) is a sports journalist for NFL.com specializing in professional football. Battista was the reporter who asked a question of then-New York Jets head coach Herm Edwards when Edwards launched into his monologue about how "You play to win the game."

Early life and education
Battista was raised in South Florida. She is a graduate of the University of Miami, where she majored in journalism and political science. She was an occasional contributor to The Miami Hurricane, the University of Miami student newspaper.

Career
Battista began working for the Miami Herald as a local news reporter in 1990, switching to sports in 1992. After her time there, she went on to work for Newsday for two years. Battista joined The New York Times in 1998. There, she covered the National Football League for the paper. In July 2013, she left The New York Times for NFL.com.

Personal life
Battista is married to fellow sports reporter, Anthony McCarron of New York Daily News.

References

External links 

Judy Battista articles at The New York Times
"The Big Lead: Q&A with New York Times NFL Reporter Judy Battista", May 26, 2011

Living people
1966 births
University of Miami alumni
The New York Times writers
American women sportswriters
20th-century American journalists
Sportswriters from New York (state)
21st-century American journalists
Journalists from Florida
20th-century American women
21st-century American women